Ermindo Ángel Onega (30 April 1940 – 21 December 1979) was an Argentine footballer, attacking midfielder  and forward from River Plate. He played for River Plate from 1957 to 1968, scoring 98 goals in 222 matches. In 1972, he played for Club Atlético Vélez Sársfield, scoring 6 goals in 30 matches.

Onega also had spells with Peñarol in Uruguay and La Serena in Chile. He was the older brother of Daniel Onega, also a River Plate footballer.

Onega died in a road accident in 1979 on his way to the city of Rosario. He was only 39 years old.

External links

 

1940 births
1979 deaths
People from Belgrano Department, Santa Fe
Road incident deaths in Argentina
Club Atlético River Plate footballers
Peñarol players
Club Atlético Vélez Sarsfield footballers
Argentine footballers
Argentina international footballers
Association football forwards
1966 FIFA World Cup players
Deportes La Serena footballers
Argentine Primera División players
Argentine expatriate footballers
Expatriate footballers in Chile
Expatriate footballers in Uruguay
Sportspeople from Santa Fe Province